Vadal Alexander (born March 23, 1994) is an American football guard for the St. Louis BattleHawks of the XFL. He played college football at LSU. Alexander was drafted by the Oakland Raiders in the seventh round of the 2016 NFL Draft.

High school career 
A native of Buford, Georgia, Alexander attended Buford High School, where he was a two-time Georgia AA First Team All-State offensive lineman as a junior and senior. In his senior season, the Buford Wolves went 14–1 and finished as GHSA Class AA runner-up, being upset in the state final by Calhoun.  After his senior season, Alexander participated in the Under Armour All-America Game.

Regarded as a four-star recruit by Rivals.com, Alexander was ranked as the No. 11 offensive guard prospect in the class of 2012. Alexander chose Louisiana State over offers from Alabama, Auburn, Georgia Tech, and South Carolina.

College career 
In his true freshman year at Louisiana State, Alexander played in 13 games. After an early season injury to starting left tackle Chris Faulk, Alexander moved into the starting line-up, playing every offensive snap of the final nine games at right tackle. He earned Freshman All-SEC honors by the league's coaches, and was named second team Freshman All-America by Scout.com. For his sophomore season, he replaced La'el Collins at left guard, who was moved over to left tackle. Alexander started all 13 games, and led the Tigers with 71 knockdowns on the season. In the Outback Bowl, he was on the field for 71 offensive plays and was credited with a career-high 13 knockdowns.

As a junior, Alexander remained a mainstay at left guard next to Collins as left tackle, giving LSU one of the most dominating guard-tackle combinations in college football. Running behind Collins and Alexander, freshman running back Leonard Fournette registered 1,034 rushing yards on the season. After LSU's 30–27 win over Florida, Alexander earned SEC Offensive Lineman of the Week honors. Alexander's streak of 32 straight starts snapped, however, when he missed the Arkansas game in week 11 because of a hand injury. Forgoing the option to enter the 2015 NFL draft, Alexander returned to LSU and was named Preseason First Team All-SEC. He was moved to right tackle, as previous right tackle Jerald Hawkins had to replace Collins on the left side.

It was reported in June 2019 that Alexander's father, James, received appromximately $180,000 from John Paul Funes, an LSU booster convicted in federal court of wire fraud and money laundering after embezzling hundreds of thousands of dollars from his employer, Our Lady of the Lake hospitals.

Professional career

Pre-draft 
Prior to his senior year, Alexander was considered one of the top senior prospects for the 2016 NFL draft. Alexander was invited to and played in the Senior Bowl in January 2016. Coming out of college, he was ranked as the second best offensive guard and projected to be selected in the second or third round. After the NFL Combine, Alexander was projected by the majority of analysts to be selected in the third or fourth round of the 2016 NFL Draft and was ranked the seventh best offensive guard out of the 203 available by NFLDraftScout.com.

2016 NFL Draft 
Alexander was drafted by the Raiders in the seventh round, 234th overall, in the 2016 NFL Draft. Many analysts were surprised by his drastic fall in the draft, as the majority of them had him projected as a second or third round selection. They said the steep fall in his draft stock likely came from not testing well at the combine and being seen as a prospect who better shows his talents in games. Scouts and teams also had concerns about his weight and conditioning.

Oakland Raiders 
On May 9, 2016, the Oakland Raiders signed him to a four-year, $2.41 million contract that includes a signing bonus of $76,846.

He started his rookie season as the backup right guard to veteran Gabe Jackson. Alexander made his regular season debut during the second game of the season in a loss against the Atlanta Falcons. On October 2, 2016, he made his first career start during a 28-27 victory over the Baltimore Ravens after starting right tackle Austin Howard was unable to play due to an ankle injury. Howard's backup. Menelik Watson, was unable to play after he suffered an hamstring injury and the Raider's third backup right tackle option, Matt McCants, was down with a knee injury. Although the Baltimore Ravens targeted Alexander throughout the game and he was called for three holding penalties and a false start, he managed to play well on hold his own throughout the game. He also started at right tackle the following game, helping the Raider's win 34-31 over the San Diego Chargers.

On December 4, 2016, Alexander started the game against the Buffalo Bills at tight end. He was used as an extra blocker on the opening drive and helped the Raider's defeat the Bills 38-24. The next game, he had his first official career start at right guard against the Kansas City Chiefs after starting right guard Kelechi Osemele was unable to play due to an illness that was later verified to be kidney stones. After having trouble with the Chief's defense during the first three snaps, head coach Jack Del Rio replaced him with veteran Jon Feliciano. They later rotated at right guard throughout the 13-21 loss to Kansas City.

On May 1, 2018, Alexander was suspended the first four games of the regular season for violating the league’s policy on performance-enhancing substances. He was waived by the Raiders on July 31, 2018, after failing to report to training camp.

Pittsburgh Maulers
Alexander was drafted by the Pittsburgh Maulers in the 22nd round of the 2022 USFL Draft. He was transferred to the team's inactive roster on May 6 with an arthritis flare-up. He was moved back to the active roster on May 14. He was transferred to the inactive roster again on May 20, but moved back to the active roster the next day. He became a free agent when his contract expired on December 31, 2022.

St Louis BattleHawks 
On January 1, 2023, Alexander was selected by the St. Louis BattleHawks in the eighth round of the 2023 XFL Supplemental Draft.

References

External links 
 NFL Combine profile
 LSU Tigers bio

1994 births
Living people
People from Buford, Georgia
Sportspeople from the Atlanta metropolitan area
Players of American football from Georgia (U.S. state)
American football offensive linemen
LSU Tigers football players
Oakland Raiders players
Pittsburgh Maulers (2022) players
St. Louis BattleHawks players